An Overland route or Overland trail may refer to:

Transportation routes
 Overland Route (Australia), a shipping route via the Suez Canal
 Overland Route (Union Pacific Railroad), a passenger rail line from Chicago to Oakland, California
 Overland Trail, a stagecoach and wagon trail in Colorado and Wyoming
 Overland Trail (Yukon), a Klondike Gold Rush-era road in the Yukon
 Butterfield Overland Mail, a stagecoach line between Tennessee or Missouri and California
 Central Overland Route a stagecoach line through Utah and Nevada
 The connection from Suez to Cairo, superseded by the Suez Canal

Other
 Overland Trail (TV series), a 1960s TV series about a fictional character on the Overland stage line

See also
 Overland (disambiguation)
 Overland Track, a walking track in Tasmania, Australia